Forte de São Luís is a fort located in Niterói, Rio de Janeiro in Brazil.

See also
Military history of Brazil

References

External links

Sao Luis
Buildings and structures in Rio de Janeiro (state)
Portuguese colonial architecture in Brazil